Rajendra Bajgai() is a Nepalese musician, composer and songwriter born in 1988. He was from Baridya Nepal. He has worked in more than 800 Nepali songs. His popular songs include 'Jala Joban' and 'O Mero Parana'.

About
He start his musical carrier from 2007 AD. Bajgai hasbeen worked with popular singers and songwriters of Nepal and his first Song“Kasle Choryo Othko Lali” was recorded in the year 2064BS . He also honored for national musician contribution. Bajgai has been  composed songs in Nepali as well as Hindi language. 'Musu Musu Hasera', 'Hari Bol', 'Jala Joban', 'O Mero Parana','Aama'are some Popular Songs which was composed by him.

He is awarded from 'Kalika FM Music Award' , Pim Nepal Film Festival Awards and others more.

Songs

Awards

Movie awards

Music awards

References 

Nepalese songwriters
Music directors
Living people
1988 births
Khas people